In mathematics, Niven's theorem, named after Ivan Niven, states that the only rational values of θ in the interval 0° ≤ θ ≤ 90°  for which the sine of θ degrees is also a rational number are:

In radians, one would require that 0 ≤ x ≤ /2, that x/ be rational, and that sinx be rational.  The conclusion is then that the only such values are sin 0 = 0, sin /6 = 1/2, and sin /2 = 1.

The theorem appears as Corollary 3.12 in Niven's book on irrational numbers.

The theorem extends to the other trigonometric functions as well. For rational values of  θ, the only rational values of the sine or cosine are 0, ±1/2, and ±1; the only rational values of the secant or cosecant are ±1 and ±2; and the only rational values of the tangent or cotangent are 0 and ±1.

See also
Pythagorean triples form right triangles where the trigonometric functions will always take rational values, though the acute angles are not rational
 Trigonometric functions
 Trigonometric number

References

Further reading

External links
 
 

Rational numbers
Trigonometry
Theorems in geometry
Theorems in algebra